Amanita elliptosperma, commonly known as the Atkinson's destroying angel, is a basidiomycete fungus, one of many in the genus Amanita. Although its toxicity is not confirmed, it is assumed to be deadly poisonous like its close relatives. Originally described from North Carolina, it is found in the eastern United States from New England to eastern Texas.

See also

List of Amanita species
List of deadly fungi

References

elliptosperma
Deadly fungi
Poisonous fungi
Fungi of North America
Fungi described in 1907